Amor & Pasión, initially released in Japan on 28 October 2015, is the eighth studio album by the classical crossover musical group Il Divo, formed by a male vocal quartet; the Swiss tenor Urs Bühler, the Spanish baritone Carlos Marín, the American tenor David Miller and the French pop singer Sébastien Izambard. The album was produced by Julio Reyes Copello.

Release 
The album was released across the globe in a one month period. The album was first released in Japan on 28 October 2015, in Spain on 6 November, in the United States on 13 November, and in the UK on 27 November, on Syco Music under Sony Music and on Columbia Records their final album for Sony.

Recording 
The album was recorded at the Miami Art House Studios, in the city of Miami, in 2015.
During the month of July 2015, initiated the photographic campaign for his seventh album and the recording of a new videoclip in the streets of the city of Tepoztlán, in Mexico, under the production of CTT Exp & Rentals.

Tracks 
The album contains versions of songs in traditional tango, mambo and classical bolero, with flavours and sensual rhythms of Spain, Cuba, Argentina and Mexico. It marked a new chapter in the group's career.

The album contains songs only in Spanish, with versions of "Por una cabeza" originally by Carlos Gardel and Alfredo Le Pera, "Abrázame" by Julio Iglesias and Rafael Ferro Garcia, "Si voy a perderte (Don't Wanna Lose You)" by Gloria Estefan, "Eres tú", "Quizás, quizás, quizás (Perhaps, Perhap, Perhaps)" of the composer Osvaldo Farrés, "Bésame Mucho" of the composer Consuelo Velázquez, "¿Quien Será? (Sway)" mambo composed by Pablo Beltrán Ruiz and Luis Demetrio, "Volver"  tango of Carlos Gardel, the bolero "Historia de un amor", the bolero "Contigo en la distancia" of César Portillo de la Luz, "A las mujeres que amé (To All the Girls I've Loved Before)" by Hal David and Albert Hammond and their version of "Himno de la alegría (Ode to Joy)".

Singles
"Por una cabeza"
"Si voy a perderte (Don't wanna lose you)"
"Bésame mucho"
"Abrázame"
"Quizás, quizás, quizás"

Track listing

Personnel 
Il Divo
 Carlos Marín – baritone
 Sébastien Izambard – tenor
 David Miller – tenor
 Urs Bühler – tenor

Production
 Julio Reyes Copello – producer, mixing, engineer
 Alberto Quintero – mixing 
 Maria Elisa Ayerbe – engineer, mixing
 Jan Holzer, Vitek Kral, Andrés Bermúdez, Gabriel Saientz Bandoneón, Carlos Fernando López, David Alsina, Ricardo López Lalinde  – engineer
 Dick Beetham – mastering

Other musicians
 Dan Warner – Guitar
 Guillermo Vadalá – bass
 Julio Reyes Copello – piano, programmer, arrangement
 Richard Bravo – percussion
 David Alsina - Bandoneon
 Juan Camilo Arboleda – orchestral arrangements
 Carlos Fernando López – orchestral arrangements, programmer
 Ricardo López Lalinde – programmer

Charts

Weekly charts

Year-end charts

Certifications

See also
 List of number-one Billboard Latin Albums from the 2010s
 List of number-one Billboard Latin Pop Albums from the 2010s

References 

Il Divo albums
2015 albums
Albums produced by Julio Reyes Copello
Columbia Records albums
Sony Music albums
Spanish-language albums
Syco Music albums
Latin music albums by English artists